William J. Chiego (born September 17, 1943 in Newark, New Jersey) is an American museum curator, who has been director of the McNay Art Museum in San Antonio since 1991.

Education
Raised in Red Bank, New Jersey, Chiego graduated from Red Bank High School in 1961. Chiego received a B.A. in history and was elected to Phi Beta Kappa at the University of Virginia. He earned a Ph.D. in the history of art from Case Western Reserve University in a joint program with the Cleveland Museum of Art. Chiego has been a resident fellow at the Yale Center for British Art, New Haven, Connecticut, and a participant in the Museum Management Institute. He is active in the Association of Art Museum Directors (AAMD) and is a former board member of that organization. He has also served as an adjunct professor and lecturer at both Oberlin College and at Trinity University in San Antonio.

Early career
Chiego came to the McNay Art Museum from Oberlin, Ohio, where he served as the director of the Allen Memorial Art Museum at Oberlin College from 1986 to 1991. Previously, he had held curatorial posts at the North Carolina Museum of Art in Raleigh, the Portland Art Museum in Oregon and the Toledo Museum of Art in Ohio.

McNay Art Museum and its expansion
In the twenty years since his arrival at the McNay Art Museum, Chiego is credited with having built on the strengths of the museum's original collections to develop new areas of concentration. Under his directorship, the museum's collection has more than doubled, to nearly 19,000 works of art, with an emphasis on modern sculpture, prints and drawings (particularly Mexican prints), theatre arts, and contemporary works in various media. Chiego has undertaken a comprehensive conservation program, bringing in conservators to assess the condition of individual works, as well as renovating the museum's environmental systems.

In 1997 Chiego initiated a strategic plan for additional space to accommodate the needs of the museum's exhibition schedule and growing collection. After overseeing the $7.1 million renovation of the museum's landmark Spanish Colonial Revival facility in 2001, Chiego, with the museum's board of trustees, spearheaded the $50 million capital campaign for construction of the Jane & Arthur Stieren Center for Exhibitions. The addition designed by award-winning architect Jean-Paul Viguier, which opened in June 2008, nearly doubled the size of the museum, allowing for year-round installation of significant works in the collection. Major exhibitions hosted by the Stieren Center include George Rickey Kinetic Sculpture: A Retrospective; Reclaimed: Paintings from the Collection of Jacques Goudstikker; and George Nelson: Architect, Writer, Designer, Teacher.

Exhibitions and authored books
Chiego has organized scores of exhibitions and produced numerous publications, writing on subjects such as the French Romantic painters and printmakers Carle Vernet and Théodore Géricault, the Scottish Romantic painter Sir David Wilkie, modern sculpture, and the history of collecting. Among the exhibitions he has organized at the McNay are Auguste Rodin: Selections from the Fine Arts Museum of San Francisco, O’Keeffe and Texas, and retrospectives on San Antonio artists Reginald Rowe, Carl Rice Embrey and César Martínez. Chiego has overseen several publications highlighting the museum's history and its collections, including Modern Art at The McNay (2001), An Eye for the Stage: The Tobin Collection of Theatre Arts at the McNay Art Museum (2004), From Goya to Johns: Fifty Master Prints at the McNay Art Museum (2004), McNay Art Museum: An Introduction (2010), and Jane & Arthur Stieren Center for Exhibitions, McNay Art Museum (2011).

References

1943 births
Living people
American art curators
Case Western Reserve University alumni
Directors of museums in the United States
People from Red Bank, New Jersey
Red Bank Regional High School alumni
University of Virginia alumni